Martin Lazarov is a retired Bulgarian mixed martial artist who competed in the Heavyweight division.

One round eye MMA Rings Russia was held in Ekaterinburg. He lost in the Submission (Guillotine Choke) at 1R 10:00 to Fedor Emelianenko. MMA two round eyes Rings Russia he lost in a decision (4-0 Points) at 1R 2:24 to Mikhail Ilyukhin.

Mixed martial arts record

|-
| Loss
| align=center| 0-2
| Mikhail Ilyukhin
| Decision (4-0 Points)
| Rings Russia - Russia vs. Bulgaria
| 
| align=center| 1
| align=center| 10:00
| Ekaterinburg, Russia
| 
|-
| Loss
| align=center| 0-1
| Fedor Emelianenko
| Submission (guillotine choke)
| Rings Russia: Russia vs. Bulgaria
| 
| align=center| 1
| align=center| 2:24
| Ekaterinburg, Sverdlovsk Oblast, Russia
|

External links
 

Living people
Bulgarian male mixed martial artists
Heavyweight mixed martial artists
Year of birth missing (living people)